The Holy Protection of Mary Byzantine Catholic Eparchy of Phoenix, commonly known as the Eparchy of Phoenix and formerly known as the Byzantine Catholic Eparchy of Van Nuys, is a Ruthenian Greek Catholic Church territory jurisdiction or eparchy of the Catholic Church in the western United States.  Its episcopal see is Phoenix, Arizona. The last bishop was the Most Reverend John Stephen Pazak.

The Eparchy of Phoenix's territorial jurisdiction consists of thirteen Western States. Churches are presently located in the states of Alaska, Arizona, California, Colorado, Nevada, New Mexico, Oregon, and Washington. It is a suffragan eparchy in the ecclesiastical province of the metropolitan Archeparchy of Pittsburgh. , Holy Protection Eparchy of Phoenix has 19 parishes and 2 missions under its canonical jurisdiction. Most parishes follow the Ruthenian recension, although the eparchy includes one parish of the Italo-Albanian Catholic Church and one of the Russian Greek Catholic Church.

History
The creation of a new eparchy for the western United States was proposed by the metropolitan Council of Hierarchs in 1981. The Congregation for the Oriental Churches, a dicastery of the Roman Curia responsible for the Eastern Catholic Churches in communion with the Holy See, recommended the erection of a new eparchy, and it was approved  by Pope John Paul II.

The Eparchy of Van Nuys was canonically inaugurated on March 9, 1982, when Archbishop Stephen Kocisko, Metropolitan of the Metropolia of Pittsburgh enthroned Thomas Dolinay as the first bishop of the eparchy. Archbishop Pio Laghi, Apostolic Delegate to the United States, represented the Roman Pontiff and read the Papal Bulla creating the eparchy and appointing Dolinay. Cardinal Timothy Manning, Archbishop of Los Angeles delivered the homily. The Church of St. Mary in Sherman Oaks, California, was designated as the cathedral.

In 1990, with the retirement of Archbishop Kocisko of Pittsburgh approaching, Pope John Paul II relieved Dolinay of his duties as Bishop of Van Nuys and appointed him Coadjutor Archbishop of the Byzantine Catholic Archeparchy of Pittsburgh on February 19, 1990. The Pope appointed the Auxiliary Bishop of Passaic, George M. Kuzma, to succeed Bishop Dolinay.

After the Northridge earthquake of 1994 damaged the Cathedral of St. Mary, the eparchial offices, and the bishop's residence, Bishop Kuzma moved his office and residence to Phoenix, Arizona.  On February 10, 2010, the seat of the diocese was officially changed to Phoenix.  Accordingly, the former pro-cathedral of St. Stephen was given the title of Cathedral, and the Cathedral of St. Mary received the title of Proto-Cathedral.

Eparchs
The eparchal headquarters are at 8105 North 16th Street, Phoenix, Arizona.

Ordinaries
 Bishop Thomas Dolinay (1982–1990) †
 Bishop George Kuzma (1991–2000) †
 Bishop William C. Skurla (2002–2007)
 Bishop Gerald N. Dino (2007–2016)
 Bishop John Stephen Pazak (2016–2021)
Kurt Burnette (Apostolic Administrator, 2023–present; Apostolic Administrator Sede vacante as of January 23, 2023)
† = deceased

Other priests of this eparchy who became bishops
 Kurt Richard Burnette, appointed Bishop of Passaic (Ruthenian) in 2013

Statistics
The eparchy has 19 parishes, two missions, 2,261 faithful, 35 priests, 12 deacons and 1 religious.

See also
Byzantine Catholic Metropolitan Church of Pittsburgh
 Byzantine Catholic Archeparchy of Pittsburgh
 Byzantine Catholic Eparchy of Parma
 Byzantine Catholic Eparchy of Passaic
 Byzantine Catholic Exarchate of Saints Cyril and Methodius of Toronto
 

Parishes
St. Stephen Byzantine Catholic Cathedral, the current cathedral
Cathedral of St. Mary Byzantine Catholic Church, the former cathedral
Saint Anne Byzantine Catholic Church

References

Bibliography

External links
Eparchy of Phoenix
Ruthenian Catholic Eparchy of Phoenix Official Site
 Eparchy of Van Nuys (Ruthenian) at catholic-hierarchy.org
 Eparchy of Phoenix (Ruthenian) at catholic-hierarchy.org
 Saint Anne Catholic Church of the Byzantine Rite, a parish of the Eparchy of Phoenix in San Luis Obispo, California
 St. Basil the Great Parish, a parish of the Eparchy of Phoenix in Los Gatos, California

Other
The Archeparchy of Pittsburgh
 Metropolia of Pittsburgh
 Byzantine Catholic Church in America

Phoenix
Phoenix
Eastern Catholicism in Arizona
Eastern Catholicism in California
Culture of Phoenix, Arizona
Christian organizations established in 1982
Phoenix
Rusyn-American culture in Arizona
Rusyn-American culture in California
Rusyn-American history
1982 establishments in Arizona